A Christmas calendar, is a form of Nordic episodic radio or television advent calendar focused on Christmas. It was first introduced in 1957, in Sweden, with the radio series, Barnens adventskalender.

Each series consists of 24 episodes which air daily beginning on the first of December, and ending on Christmas Eve. The first Christmas calendar was the Swedish Titteliture. The first such series aired in Denmark was Historier fra hele verden in 1962. The form gradually extended into the other Nordic countries of Norway, Finland and Iceland, and in the 21st century also extended into Germany.

Most Christmas calendars are produced for children, while some cater to both children and adults, and even some are directed at adults alone. Many Christmas calendar series, such as the 1979 Norwegian Jul i Skomakergata, and the 1990 Icelandic Á baðkari til Betlehem have become classics in their respective countries, and are enjoyed both by children and adults (if purely for nostalgic reasons).

Christmas calendars very often feature "tomter" or "nisser", and occasionally a Santa Claus figure.

See also

 Nisse
 Pyrus Series
 Santa Claus

References

Nordic Christmas traditions
Advent
Christmas television series